Qombovan (also Romanized as Qombovān, Qambovān, and Qombavān; also known as Ghombasvan, Kombon, Kūmāon, and Qumboān) is a village in Qombovan Rural District, in the Central District of Dehaqan County, Isfahan Province, Iran. At the 2006 census, its population was 1,792, in 548 families.

References 

Populated places in Dehaqan County